Great Britain women's national bandy team represents the United Kingdom in the sport of bandy. It is controlled by the Great Britain Bandy Association.

The team made its international debut at the 2022 Women's Bandy World Championship, finishing in 6th place overall among eight teams.

Earlier attempt, for England 
Coached by Hungarian former world championship player György Dragomir, a team representing England planned to participate at the 2014 Women's Bandy World Championship, but was eventually not scheduled to appear.

See also
Bandy
Rink bandy
Women's Bandy World Championship
Sweden women's national bandy team
Russia women's national bandy team
Finland women's national bandy team
Norway women's national bandy team
Switzerland women's national bandy team
China women's national bandy team
Canada women's national bandy team
United States women's national bandy team
Hungary women's national bandy team
Soviet Union women's national bandy team

References

External links 
 Great Britain national women's bandy team (Instagram) 

National bandy teams
Bandy
Bandy in the United Kingdom